Kay Brown may refer to:

 Kay B. Barrett (1902–1995), née Brown, American Hollywood talent scout and agent
 Kay Brown (artist) (1932–2012), African American artist
 Kay Brown (politician) (born 1948), American politician and educator
 Kay Brown (singer) (1933–2022), American singer